Maurice Mandelbaum (born December 9, 1908, in Chicago; died January 1, 1987, Hanover, New Hampshire) was an American philosopher and phenomenologist . He was professor of philosophy at Johns Hopkins University with stints at Dartmouth College and Swarthmore College. He held two degrees from Dartmouth and a PhD from Yale University. He was known for his work in phenomenology, epistemology, philosophy of perception (especially critical realism), and the history of ideas.

Works 
He wrote many books, including:
 The Problem of Historical Knowledge, 1938
 The Phenomenology of Moral Experience, 1955
 Philosophy, Science and Sense Perception, 1964
 History, Man, and Reason: A study in Nineteenth Century Thought, 1971
 The Anatomy of Historical Knowledge, 1977
 Philosophy, History, and the Sciences, 1984

References

External links 
 Mandelbaum booklist

1908 births
1987 deaths
People from Chicago
20th-century American philosophers